Shpëtim Kapidani (born 9 September 1971) is an Albanian former footballer who played as a midfielder. He made one appearance for the Albania national team in 1993.

References

External links
 

1971 births
Living people
Albanian footballers
Association football midfielders
Albania international footballers
KF Teuta Durrës players
Place of birth missing (living people)